The Trader is a 2018 short documentary film following a traveling trader living in poverty in the rural life of the Republic of Georgia. It won the Best Short Documentary Award at the Hot Docs Canadian International Documentary Festival in 2017, and the Sundance Film Festival Short Film Jury Award.

The documentary was released on Netflix on February 9, 2018.

References

External links
 
 
 

2018 short documentary films
Netflix original documentary films
Short documentary films from Georgia (country)
2010s Georgian-language films